This is a list of ziyarat locations from all around the world. Ziyarat locations are often shrines dedicated to various Muslim saints and Awliya but can also be places that are associated with them, like zawiyas.

List

Afghanistan

 Muhammad Jaunpuri shrine, Farah, Farah Province
 Khwaja 'Abd Allah Ansari shrine, Herat, Herat Province
 Shrine of Ali Karam Allah Wajho ("the Blue Mosque"), Mazar-i-Sharif, Balkh Province
 Khwaja Abu Nasr Parsa shrine, Balkh, Balkh Province
 Baba Hatim Ziyarat, Imam Sahib, Kunduz Province

Albania

Algeria

Azerbaijan
Bibi-Heybat Mosque.

Bosnia and Herzegovina

Brunei

Bulgaria

Canada
 Shah Mansoor Ali Ahmed Sabri, Toronto, ON

Chad

Comoros

Cyprus
1.Hala Sultan Tekke or  Mosque of Umm Haram (Larnaca )

2. Mauláná Shaykh Muḥammad Nazım 'Adil al-Haqqani ( Lefke )

3. Saint Barnabas Monastery (Tuzla 99500)

4. Kutup Turbesi (Polatpasa Bulvari, Gazimagusa 99450)

5. Hazrat Omer Tomb

Djibouti

Egypt

Ghana

Greece

India

Khawaja Amjad Ali Nizami 
Sjjada Naseen Khankahe Maula Ali &
Astana e Amjadiya Plot No 5 Mishrapur Kursi Road Near Rukmani Cold Store, Lucknow UP India ( 226026)

Gujarat
 Hussain Tekri , Kanodar
 Mazar e Qutbi , Ahemdabad
Mazar e Saifee , Surat
 Shrine of Ibrahim, Bhadresar, Kutch district
 Shrine of Shah-e-Alam's Roza in Ahmedabad
 Shrine Sarkhej Roza of Ganj Ahmed Kahttu in Sarkhej, Ahmedabad
 Qutub-e-Alam's Mosque in Vatwa, Ahmedabad
 Shrine of Sultan Ahmed Shah
 Shrine of Sultan Saiyad Sidi in Ahmedabad
 Shrine of Khwaja Jamaluddin Dana in Surat
 Shrine of Saiyad Ahmed Al Addrus in Bharuch
 Shrine of Baba Ghor near Jagadia
 Shrine of Baba Rustam shah near Tankaria
 Shrine of Pir Bukhari in Bhadiyad near Dholka
 Shrine of Haji Pir in Kutch.
 Shrine of Shah Vajihuddin Alvi Husayni in Ahmedabad
 Saiyed Shah jalaluddin Chisty Nizami Hussaini, savli Near Gothada, Vadodara
 Saiyed Aalad (Alauddin) Al Hussaini Zaidi Ul wasti, savli Near Gothada, Vadodara
 Saiyed Mustufa Al Hussaini Zaidi Ul wasti, Thasra, Dist Kheda Gujarat
 Saiyed Nateeb Al Hussaini Zaidi Ul wasti, Pali, Dist Kheda Gujarat
 Shah Wajihuddin AlviGujarati Shattari Dargah SharifAhmedabad
 Saiyed Peer Muhammad Shah Al Hussaini Ahmedabad Gujarat

Delhi
 Qutbuddin Bakhtiar Kaki,Delhi 
 Nizamuddin Auliya, Delhi
 Nasiruddin Chiragh Dehlavi, Delhi 
  Syed Qutabuddin Dehlvi son of Fakharuddin Dehlvi
  Shah Nasiruddin Kaly Mian son of Syed Qutabuddin Dehlvi

Uttar Pradesh
  Shrine of Mujaddid Ahmed Raza Khan,
  Syed Jamal Shah Khurmy waly, Moradabad,
  Shah Ahmad Shah pir je sarkar, Rampur, Moradabad,
  Syed Chishti Miyan, Moradabad,
 Bareilly Sharif Dargah, Bareilly, Bareilly district
 Waris Ali Shah Dargah, Dewa, Barabanki district

Sultan Syed Ashraf Jahangir Semnani Dargah, Ashrafpur Kichhauchha
Syed Mohammed Mukhtar Ashraf Dargah, Ashrafpur Kichhauchha

Jammu & Kashmir
 Charari Sharief, Budgam district
 Dastgeer Sahib, Khanyar, Srinagar district
 Hazratbal Shrine, Hazratbal, Srinagar district
 Khanqah-e-Moula, Srinagar, Srinagar district
 Ziyarat Naqshband Sahab, Khanyar, Srinagar district
 Dargah Aaliyah Owaisiah Kashira Kupwara
 Hazrat alhaaj Qutub ul Aqtaab Moulana Muhammad Amin Owaisi, Kashira Kupwara
 Tomb of Shams-ud-Din Araqi, Chadoora, Budgam district
 Aga Sahib Shrine, Budgam
 Aga Mir Syed Mohammad Baqir Mosavi, Wahabpora, Budgam district
 Hazrat Mir Syed Haji Mohammad Murad Bukhari Qazi Kashmir, Kreeri, Baramulla district 
Hamzah Makhdoom, srinagar kashmir
Baba Naseeb-ud-Din Ghazi (Bijbeharah)
Syed Ali Allauddin (khansahib) Ravi Al-Bukhari chewdara, beerwah, Kashmir

Kerala

 Cheraman Juma Mosque, Methala, Kodungallur Taluk, Thrissur district
 Malik Dinar Mosque (Malik Deenar Grand Juma Masjid), Thalangara, Kasaragod district
 Madavoor CM Maqam, Madavoor, Kozhikode district, Kerala
 Mamburam Thangal Maqam (Malappuram), Chemmad, Malappuram district
 Veliyankod Umar Khazi Maqam (Veliyankod), Veliyankod, Malappuram district
 Zainudeen Makhdoom RA Maqam (Ponnani), Ponnani, Malappuram district
 Beema palli maqam (Poonthura), Trivandrum, Trivandrum district
 [ [ KOCHU THANGAL RA MAQAM (KOLLAM PALLIMUKKU)]],   KOLLAM DISTRICT
 KUNJU MUHIYADHEEN SHAH RA MAQAM (KOLLAM PALLIMUCK)  KOLLAM DISTRICT

Maharashtra 
 Valley of Saints (shrines of several Sufi saints and the Mughal emperor Aurangzeb), Khuldabad, Aurangabad district,
 Moulaya Najam khan Aurangabad, 
 Raudat Tahera Mumbai
 Hazrat Syed FAZLE MOHAMMAD ALmaroof PAPPAL SHAH BABA Chisty R.A Umred Nagpur

[Mufti e Aazam Maharashtra mufti Mohammad Mujeeb Ashraf Razvi ul Qadri sahab qibla Alahirrehma] [Nagpur]

Rajasthan
 Ajmer Sharif Dargah (shrine to Moinuddin Chishti), Ajmer, Ajmer district
 Mazar-E-Fakhri (shrine to Syedi Fakhruddin), Galiakot, Dungarpur District

Tamil Nadu
 Sambaipatinam  Jamaliya Assyed Muhammed Moulana Al Hasaniul Hashimi Nayagam [Jamaliya Moulana] Darga - Sambaipatinam, Peravurni Taluk, Tanjavur District.
 Tirumullaivasal  Jamaliya Syed Yaseen Moulana Al Hasaniul Hashimi Nayagam Darga - Tirumullaivasal,Sirkali Taluk,Nagapatinam District.

 Sultan Syed Ibrahim Shaheed Badusha Dargah, Erwadi, Ramanathapuram district
 Thiruparankundram Dargah (Sultan Sikandar Badushah Shaheed shrine), Thiruparankundram, Madurai district
 Nagore Shahul Hamid Badusha Dargah, Nagore, Nagapattinam district
 Madurai Maqbara (dargah of Mir Ahmad Ibrahim, Mir Amjad Ibrahim, and Abdus Salam Ibrahim), Madurai, Madurai district
 Chennai  Hazrath Badaruddin Shaheed R.A - Zamin Pallavarram, Hazrat Tamim_al-Ansari R.A - Kovalam, Hazrath Syed Moosa Sha Qadri R.A - Mount Road, Hazrath Dastagir Saheb - Mount Road

Punjab
 Tomb of Ameer Ali Shah (Sri Mukhstar Sahib)
Shrine Baba Khaki Shah Sattar (Dera baba khaki shah malang kattu, Bhathlan)
Shrine Baba Bharpoor Shah Sattar (Peerkhana Jassara)
Shrine Baba Waryam Shah Sattar (Pind maida zila fatehgarh saheb ji)
shrine dera baba murad shah ji (amardas colony, nakodar, punjab)
shrine roza sharif mandhali darbar (mandhali, phagwara, punjab)

Madhya Pradesh
Khirala Sharif Dargah Khirala, district Khandwa
Mazar e Najmi , Ujjain
Dargah e Hakimi , (shrine of Syedi Abdul Qadir Hakimuddin)Burhanpur

Indonesia

Many Indonesians visit the royal Javanese graves, or the cemeteries of former presidents and Muslim missionaries.
 Wali Sanga whose tombs spread across Java
 Astana Giribangun
 Giriloyo
 Imogiri
 Kota Gede

Iran

Iran's Cultural Heritage Organization lists several hundred "ziyarat-gah" or places of pilgrimage in which a sage Imamzadeh, or Imam were buried in Iran. Some of the more popular ones include:

 Fatima Masumeh Shrine, Qom. Tomb of Fātimah bint Mūsā (sister of eight Shia Twelver Imam Ali al-Ridha and the daughter of the seventh Shia Imam Musa al-Kadhim) and three daughters of the ninth Shia Twelver Imam, Muhammad al-Jawad.
 Jamkaran, Qom
 Imam Reza shrine – a large complex, developed on the burial site of the Eighth Shī`a Imām, 'Ali ar-Ridha, Mashad
 Shah-Abdol-Azim shrine. Tomb of: ‘Abdul ‘Adhīm ibn ‘Abdillāh al-Hasanī (aka. Shah Abdol Azim, a fifth generation descendant of Hasan ibn ‘Alī and a companion of the ninth Shī‘ah Twelver Imām, Muhammad al-Jawad). Adjacent to the shrine, within the complex, are the mausolea of Imamzadeh Tahir (son of the fourth Shī‘ah Twelver Imām Ali ibn Husayn Zayn al-Abidin), and Imamzadeh Hamzeh (brother of the eighth Shī‘ah Twelver Imām Ali al-Ridha).
 Imamzadeh Saleh, Shemiran. Tomb of Sāleh (son of the seventh Shī‘ah Twelver Imām Musa al-Kadhim).

Iraq

Imām ‘Alī Mosque in Najaf. Tomb of ‘Alī ibn Abī Tālib (First Shī‘ah Imām – Fourth Sunni Caliph), Adam (Shī‘ah belief), Noah (Shī‘ah belief).
Imām Husayn Mosque in Karbala. Tomb of Husayn ibn ‘Alī (Third Shī‘ah Imām), ‘Ali Akbar ibn Husayn, ‘Ali Asghar ibn Husayn, Habīb ibn Madhāhir, All the martyrs of Karbalā, Ibrāhīm ibn Mūsā al-Kādhim.
Al ‘Abbās Mosque in Karbala. Tomb of ‘Abbās ibn `Alī.
Al Kādhimiya Mosque in Kadhimayn. Tomb of Seventh Twelver Shī‘ah Imām, Mūsā al-Kādhim; Ninth Twelver Shī‘ah Imām, Muhammad at-Taqī; Shaykh Mufīd; Shaykh Tūsī.
Al ‘Askarī Mosque in Samarra. Tomb of Tenth Twelver Shī‘ah Imām, ‘Alī an-Naqī; Eleventh Twelver Shī‘ah Imām, Hasan al-‘Askarī; Hakimah Khātūn; Narjis Khātūn
Abu Hanifa Mosque. Tomb of Abū Ḥanīfa (founder of the Sunni Hanafi school of Islamic jurisprudence.)
Tomb of Ezekiel, Al-Nukhaliah Mosque, Al Kifl, Babil Governorate
Abdul Qadir Gilani, founder of the Qadiri tariqa, buried in Baghdad

Israel and Palestinian Territories

 Masjid Al Aqsa, built over the spot where the Islamic prophet Muhammad is said to have prayed before he ascended to the heavens; Jerusalem
 Masjid Sakhra (Dome of the Rock), built over the rock from whence legend holds Muhammad is to have ascended to the heavens; Jerusalem
 Tomb of Moses,  from Jerusalem
 Cave of the Patriarchs, Hebron
 Joseph's Tomb, outside Nablus
 Tomb of Lot, Bani Na'im
 Tomb of Tamim al-Dari, Bayt Jibrin
 Sayed al-Hashim Mosque –  Muhammad's great grandfather, Gaza
 Tomb of Samuel, Nabi Samwil
 Sidna Ali Mosque, Herzliya – Tomb of Ibn Aleem which was a Muslim saint that fell during the Battle of Arsuf
 Nabi Rubin Mosque, Palmachim – the Muslim traditional burial site of Reuben. The shrine is abandoned.
 Nabi Yahya Mosque, Sebastia – tomb of John the Baptist
 Nebi Akasha Mosque, Jerusalem – tomb of Ukasha ibn al-Mihsan, a friend of Muhammad and also a burial place for some Muslim saints from Saladin's army. The shrine is abandoned. See also Expedition of Ukasha bin Al-Mihsan (Udhrah and Baliy).
 Tomb of Joshua (Shia Islam), Ramot Naftali – Shiite shrine of Yusha's (Joshua) tomb. The village which includes the shrine was Shiite and destroyed in 1948. The shrine is abandoned.
 Nabi Bulus, Beit Shemesh – the shrine of Paul the Apostle in the Muslim tradition (unlike the Christian one which is in Rome). The shrine is abandoned.
 Maqam Shihab al-Din, Nazareth – a small shrine and mosque on rooftop and the burial place of Shihab al-Din, Saladin's nephew who died at the Battle of Hattin near Tiberias. Located in front of the Basilica of the Annunciation.
 Mosque of Omar, Jerusalem – in front of the Church of the Holy Sepulchre, Omar prayed there after refusing to pray inside the church, it is also believed to be the place that David prayed.
 Jubb Yussef (Joseph's Well) – the well that Joseph was thrown in. Abandoned shrine.
 Tomb of Nabi Saleh, Ramla – Saleh mentioned seven times in the Quran as the prophet who told Mada'in Saleh residents to convert their religion to Islam, after they didn't listened to him the city was destroyed by god. His tomb locked near the White Mosque in the city of Ramla which is the biggest remains of early Islamic mosque in Israel, any spring in year there is an annual pilgrimage celebrations in the shrine.
 Maqam al-Nabi Shu'ayb, Horns of Hattin – Ziyarat al-Nabi Shu'ayb is the biggest Druze Ziyarat
 Maqam al-Nabi Sabalan, Hurfeish

Jordan
 An-Nabi Yusha’ bin Noon (Joshua bin Nun), near the city of Al-Salt in Jordan – shrine of Yusha' (Joshua)

Kazakhstan
 Aisha Bibi
 Mausoleum of Khoja Akhmet Yassawi, Turkistan

Kyrgyzstan
 Safed Bulan
 Sulayman-Too

Lebanon

Libya

North Macedonia

Malaysia

Mali

Mauritania

Montenegro

Morocco
 Imam al Jazuli - Marrakech
 Qadi 'Iyad al Maliki - Marrakech
 Zawiya Moulay Idris - Fes
 Zawiya Shaykh Ahmad Tijani - Fes
 Seven Saints of Marrakech - Marrakech
 Syed Abdul Aziz Dabbagh, Ghaus ul Waqt.
 Abd as-Salam ibn Mashish al-Alami - Moulay Abdeslam

Nigeria

Pakistan

Lahore Pakistan: Bibi Pak Daman, daughter of Hazrat Ali (as) and sister of Hazrat Abbas ibn Ali (as) and her 3 daughters (granddaughters of Imam Ali (as)

Hazrat Pir Syed Ghulam Haider Ali Shah (Jalalpur Sharif, Jhelum, Pakistan)

Moulana Ash'Shaikh Muhammad Khan Hanafi Qadri Naqshbandi.(1920-1980) Jaranwala Road Faisalabad
 Syedi wa Moulaya Bhaijee Bhai Saheb, Chand Bibi Road, Ranchore Lane, Karachi, Pakistan. 
 Syed Sajjad Ali Chishti Nizami Sabri Qadri Moradabadi, Railway Headquarter, Lahore Punjab.
 Hazrat Pir Muhammad Inayat Ahmad Naqshbndi RH, Ganj e Inayat Sarkar Kabootar Pura 
 Mian Abdul Sattar Chishti Nizami almaroof Baba Sabeel Shah Oliya, Railway Headquarter, Lahore Punjab.
 Darbar Bibi Pak Daman Lahore, Punjab
Darbar Hazrat Baba fareed ganjshakar Pakpattan shareef,Punjab
 Shrine of Shah Abdul Latif Bhittai, Bhit, Sindh
 Shrine of Lal Shahbaz Qalandar, Jamshoro District, Sindh 
 Sachal Sarmast Daraza, Dist.Khairpur Sindh
 Syed Baba Mureed Ali Shah Mehrabpur Dist Naushahro froze sindh.
 Pir Juman Shah Qurashi Padidan Naushahro Froze Sindh
 Pir Shaikh Ahmed Kabir Qurashi Padidan Dist Naushahro froze sindh.
 Syed Ibrahim Shah near Bhira Road Dist Naushahro froze sindh.
 pir Wanhiyal Dist Naushahro froze sindh.
 Abdullah Shah Gazi, Karachi Sindh
 shah shams sabswāri multan pakistan
 Dargah of Syed Ali Miran Al Naqvi Bhakkari, Mona Syedan, Punjab
 Shrine of Usman bin Ali al Ghaznavi Alias Data Ganj Bakhsh Ali Hajveri, Lahore, Punjab
 Shrine of Bulleh Shah (Abdullah), Kasur, Punjab
 Shrine of Pir Syed Meher Ali Shah, Golra Sharif, Golra, Islamabad.
Shrine of Pir Muhammad Qasim Sadiq Mohrvi from Mohra SharifMurree Rawalpindi Punjab Pakistan
Peer Pathan (Tonsa Sharif) Punjab Pakistan, Dera Ghazi Khan
 Shrine of Pir Hadi Hassan Bux Shah Jilani, Duthro Sharif, Sanghar, Sindh
 Shrine & Darbar of Syed Jalaluddin Surkh-Posh Bukhari (Uch Sharif)
 Darbar of Hazrat Nausha Ganj Bakhsh Qadri (RA). Mandi bahauddin Punjab.
 Hazrat Khwaja Ghulam Mohiuddin Gaznavi (RA) and Shaykh ul Alam- Pir Muhammad Alauddin Siddiqui(RA) [Nerian Sharif-AZAD KASHMIR PAKISTAN]

Azad Kashmir
Shrine of  Pir Ghulam Mohiudin Ghaznavi(great sufi of Naqshbandi Order ) at Nerian SharifAzad Kashmir Pakistan 
Shrine of Pir Alauddin Siddiqui Nerian SharifAzad Kashmir Pakistan.He was the founder of Mohiudin Islamic University Nerian Sharif and Mohi ud din medical college Mirpur

Philippines

Russia

Bashkortostan
Chishmy, Chishminsky where an early Muslim ruler is buried 
Starobairamgulovo, Uchalinsky District where two awliya are buried

Saudi Arabia
 Al-Masjid an-Nabawi, Medina
 Maqbaratu l-Baqī' in Medina and the Fathima bint Muhammad Hasan ibn Ali, Ali ibn al-Husayn Zayn al-'Abidin, Muhammad al-Baqir, and Ja'far al-Sadiq are present here
 Badr Shohada Graveyard at Badr close to Masjid Al Areesh
 Jabl Al Malaika (Mountain Where Angels Descended) at Badr (RQ67+PV9, Badr 46353, Saudi Arabia)
 Jannatul Mualla, Makkah – graves of: Abd Manaf ibn Qusai, Hashim ibn 'Abd Manaf, Abdul Mutallib, and Abu Talib ibn ‘Abd al-Muttalib, among others
 Mount Uhud, the site of the Battle of Uhud, Medina
 Hira, the cave where the angel Gabriel first visited Muhammad, Mecca
 Thawr, the cave where Muhammad and his companion Abu Bakr took refuge in the first few days of the Hijrah (migration) from Mecca to Medina
 Quba Mosque, Medina
 Masjid al-Qiblatain, Medina

Somalia

Sri Lanka
 Shaikh Usman Waliyullah Shrine, Colombo
 Shaykh Ashraf Waliyullah, Ketchchimalai Mosque, Beruwela
 Shaykh Ahmed Ibn Mubarak Mawlana, Galle
 Darvish Muhiyiddeen Waliyullah, Dafthar Jailani, Kuragala
 Sheikh Inayathullah Waliyullah, Kapthurai Mosque, Weligama
 Sheikh Abdullah Ibn Umar Badheeb Al Yamani Rahimahullah , Kahatowita 
 Kunjali Marikkar Rahimahullah, Chilaw
 Bawa Kufi Waliyullah, Kahatapitiya
 Seyyaduna Tuan Zainul Abdeen Sri Pathy Zeenath Raja Waliyullah, Gongawela, Matale
 Seyyada Poong Kullanthai Amma Waliyullah, Nanu Oya
 Sultan Abdul Qadir Waliyullah, Mankumban, Jaffna
 Seyyaduna Kappal Appa Waliyullah, Talai Mannar, Mannar 
 Dawood Mawlana Waliyullah, Kalmunai
 Seyyaduna Shihabuddeen Waliyullah, Batticaloa
 Seyyaduna Abdul Qadir Waliyullah, Mancholai, Kinniya
 Khorasan Seyyid Ismail Waliyullah (Galebandara Awliya), Kurunagala 
 Seyyiduna Akeel Muhammad Waliyullah, kotiyakumbura, Kegalle
 Seyyaduna Abdul Jabbar Pal Kudi Bawa Waliyullah, Kataragama
 Shaykh Shihabdeen Waliyullah, Meera Makam Mosque, Kandy

Sudan

Syria
 Sayyidah Zaynab Mosque, the tomb of Zaynab bint Ali, daughter of Ali and Fatimah, Damascus
 Sayyidah Ruqayya Mosque, the tomb of Sukayna bint Husayn, daughter of Husayn ibn Ali – the grandson of Muhammad, Damascus
 Bab Saghir Cemetery (also called Goristan-e-Ghariban), Damascus. Many famous historical figures, including Umm Kulthum bint Ali and Bilal ibn Ribah are buried here.
 Nabi Habeel Mosque, the tomb of Abel, son of Adam, Damascus
 Araq Tomb, Damascus, dedicated to Suhayb al-Rumi
 Bab al-Hadid, Aleppo
 Bab al-Nasr, Aleppo
 Bab Antakeya, Aleppo
 Hilaliyya Zawiya, Aleppo, mausoleum for Sheikh Mohammed Hilal Ram Hamdani
 Umayyad Mosque (Jaami al-Amawi), Damascus
 Salera Hill, Damascus
 Mount Qasioun, Damascus
 Abū ʿAbd Allāh Bilāl ibn Rabāḥ al-Ḥabashī, Damascus

Tajikistan
 Mir Sayyid Ali Hamadani, in kholub
 Rudaki, first great literary genius of the Modern Persian language, buried in Rudaki
 Khaja Yaqub al-Charkhi, Gulistan, Dushanbe

Tunisia

Turkey

Istanbul
Eyüp Sultan Mosque, where Muhammad's standard-bearer Abu Ayyub al-Ansari is buried, Eyüp
Yeralti Mosque (Underground Mosque), where three companions of Muhammad are buried, Karaköy
Arab Mosque, where the sahabi Maslama ibn Abd al-Malik is buried, Karaköy
Mehmet Emin Tokadi, Fatih
Helvacı Baba, a popular saint visited on Fridays, Fatih
Laleli Baba, a saint who left his mark on Istanbul 
Oruç Baba, an ascetic's tomb that is visited on the first day of Ramadan
Tezveren Dede, a warrior Sufi who participated in the Conquest of Constantinople
Zuhurat Baba, a saint who distributed endless water to the warriors of Sultan Fatih during the Conquest
Koca Mustafa Pasha Mosque, where Sünbül Efendi is buried, Fatih
Aziz Mahmud Hudayi, Üsküdar
Jamaluddin al-Kumuki, a shaykh of the Naqshbandi tariqa and relative of Imam Shamil, Karacaahmet Cemetery, Üsküdar
Joshua's Hill, the maqam of Joshua, the young companion of Musa on his sea trip to meet the sage Khidr, Beykoz
Yahya Efendi, Beshiktash
Muhammad Zafar al-Madani, spiritual guide of Sultan Abdul Hamid II, Beshiktash
Hayreddin Barbarossa, great admiral and Muslim hero of the Mediterranean, Beshiktash
Merkez Efendi, Yenikapı
Akbaba, Istanbul, where Akbaba Sultan is buried, Beykoz
Telli Baba, Sarıyer
Fatih Sultan Mehmet Mosque, where Mehmed the Conqueror is buried, Fatih
Süleymaniye Mosque, where Suleyman the Lawgiver is buried, Fatih
Sultan Abdulhamid Khan, the last effective sultan and caliph of Islam who managed to rule the Ottoman Empire and Caliphate through hard times for 33 years, Fatih

Bursa
Emir Sultan Mosque, where Emir Sultan is buried
Karabaş-i Veli Cultural Centre, where Karabash-i Veli is buried
Somuncu Baba
Üftade Mosque and complex
Molla Fanari
Ismail Haqqi Bursevi
Osman Gazi, founder of the Ottoman Empire
Orhan Gazi, son of Osman who solidified Ottoman rule in Anatolian lands
Geyikli Baba, a ghazi and dervish of the Bektashi tariqa who participated in the conquest of Bursa, Babasultan

Other cities
Rumi, Konya
Shams Tabrizi, maqam near Rumi, Konya
Sadr al-Din al-Qunawi, Konya
Ertuğrul Gazi, father of Osman Gazi, Söğüt, Bilecik
Sheikh Edebali, spiritual guide and mentor of Osman Gazi, Bilecik
Sharafuddin Daghestani, a shaykh of the Naqshbandi tariqa authorized in various other Sufi orders, Yalova
Hasan Sezayi Gulsheni, a Khalwati tariqa shaykh, Edirne
Hacı Bayram-ı Veli, most popular wali of Ankara
Shaykh Ali Semerkandi, Çamlıdere, Ankara
Yunus Emre, folk poet and Sufi mystic who greatly influenced the culture of Turkey, Yunusemre, Eskişehir Province
Battal Gazi, a warrior saint who played an important role in Turkish folk literature, Seyitgazi, Eskişehir Province
Haji Bektash Veli, founder of the Bektashi Sufi tariqa, Hacıbektaş
Shaban-i Veli, a Khalwati tariqa shaykh, Kastamonu
Hayreddin-i Tokadi, a wali buried on a mountainous city on the way between Istanbul and Ankara, Bolu
Akshamsaddin, spiritual guide and mentor of Mehmed the Conqueror, Göynük, Bolu Province
Ashab al-Kahf, the cave of the Seven Sleepers in English, Tarsus
Mevlid-i Halil Mosque, built at the site of the cave where Abraham is believed to have been born, Urfa
 Said Nursi, the maqam representing his grave since his body was exhumed and lost, Urfa
Göbekli Tepe, archeological site of the world's oldest megaliths which changed the narrative of the theory of pre-historic settlements, dating back 12,000 years, Urfa
Alyasa and Zu l-Kifl, tombs of prominent prophets mentioned in the Quran, Eğil, Diyarbakır Province
Habib-i Najjar Mosque, where the supporter of the disciples was martyred for calling the pagans to the religion of Allah, mentioned in the Quran (Ya-Sin:20-27), Antakya, Hatay
Beyazid-i Bestami Külliyesi, the maqam of Bayazid Bastami, Kırıkhan, Hatay Province

Turkmenistan
 Il Arslan Mausoleum, Kuhna Urgench
 Sultan Sanjar mausoleum, Merv
 Khoja Yusuf Hamadani, Merv

United Arab Emirates

Al-Ain
An-Neyadat Cemetery, where a companion of Muhammad is buried.

United States

Pennsylvania
Mosque of Shaikh M. R. Bawa Muhaiyaddeen

Michigan
The tomb of Baba Rexheb

Uzbekistan
Muhammad al-Bukhari mausoleum in Samarkand. He authored the hadith collection known as Sahih al-Bukhari, regarded by Sunni Muslims as one of the most authentic (sahih) hadith collections. 
Al-Tirmidhi, one of the six most authentic collectors of hadith, buried in Termez.
Imam Māturīdī, founder of one of the two main Sunni schools of aqida, buried in Samarkand.
Shah-i-Zinda necropolis. Tombs of Kusam ibn Abbas (cousin of Muhammad); many different 9th–14th century tombs of scholars, poets, military men, etc.
Baha' al-Din Naqshband, founder of what would become one of the largest Sufi Sunni orders, the Naqshbandi, buried in Bukhara.
Amir Kulal, an influential Islamic scholar of the mystical Khajagan order, buried in Bukhara.
Timur, a great conqueror from Uzbekistan, in the Gur-e-Amir mausoleum, Samarkand.

Yemen
Qabr Hud, supposed burial place of the prophet Hud.

See also
 Hajj
 Karwan islami International
 Umra
 List of Ziyarat locations in Iraq

References

Further reading
 Privratsky, Bruce G.(2001) Muslim Turkistan: Kazak Religion and Collective Memory. Richmond, Surrey: Curzon.
 Subtelny, M. E. (1989) The cult of holy places: religious practices among Soviet Muslims. Middle East Journal, 43(4): 593–604.

External links 
 Some sites in Central Asia are described on the page Ancient Monuments of Karakalpakstan with links to named archeological sites and mausoleums (Najm al-Din Kubra, Sultan Uvays Bobo, etc.)
 Views held by The Shia on Ziyarat
 Archnet shrine directory, with pictures
 Book: Your Personal Guide to UMRA, HAJJ, and ZIYARAT (pdf file)
 Listing of ziyarat sites
 Ziyarat tourism in Uzbekistan

Sufism
 
List
Lists of pilgrimage sites
Ziyarat